Jabez Delano Hammond (August 2, 1778 – August 18, 1855) was an American physician, lawyer, author and politician.

Life
Hammond was born in New Bedford, Bristol County, Massachusetts. He practiced medicine in Reading, Vermont, but afterward studied law and followed that profession at Cherry Valley.

He was a Democratic-Republican member of the United States Congress from 1815 to 1817, a member of the New York State Senate from 1817 to 1821, and a member of the Council of Appointment in 1818. In 1825, he was appointed one of the commissioners in the settlement of the claims of New York State against the Federal Government.

In April 1825, he was appointed one of three State Road Commissioners, the other two were Nathaniel Pitcher and George Morell. These commissioners had to "explore and cause surveys to be made of a route for a State road from some point on the North River to some point on Lake Erie, through the southern tier of counties."

He was First Judge of the Otsego County Court from 1838 to 1843. He was a regent of the University of the State of New York from 1845 until his death, which occurred in Cherry Valley, Otsego County, New York.

Works
The History of Political Parties in the State of New-York, from the Ratification of the Federal Constitution to 1840 by Jabez D. Hammond (4th ed., Vol. 1, H. & E. Phinney, Cooperstown, 1846)
Political History of the State of New York from January 1, 1841, to January 1, 1847, Vol III, including the Life of Silas Wright (Hall & Dickson, Syracuse NY, 1848)
 Life and Opinions of Julius Melbourn (1847)
 Life of Silas Wright (1848)

Sources

 Political Graveyard (name misspelled)
 Obit in NYT on August 23, 1855

External links 
Life and Opinions of Julius Melbourn; with Sketches of the Lives and Characters of Thomas Jefferson, John Quincy Adams, John Randolph, and Several Other Eminent American Statesmen. Syracuse: Hall & Dickson, 1847.

1778 births
1855 deaths
American biographers
American male biographers
Physicians from Vermont
New York (state) lawyers
People from New Bedford, Massachusetts
New York (state) state senators
Regents of the University of the State of New York
Democratic-Republican Party members of the United States House of Representatives from New York (state)
People from Windsor County, Vermont
People from Cherry Valley, New York
Historians from New York (state)
19th-century American lawyers